Park Tudor School is a coeducational independent college preparatory day school founded in 1902. It offers programs from junior kindergarten through high school. It is located in the Meridian Hills neighborhood of Indianapolis, Indiana, USA. A merger of Tudor Hall School for Girls (founded in 1902) and the all-male Park School (founded in 1914) formed the present-day school in 1970.

History
Park Tudor is the product of a merger of two single-sex independent schools, Tudor Hall School for Girls and Park School.

Tudor Hall School for Girls was established in 1902 by Fredonia Allen and James Cumming Smith. Allen named the school after her mother, Ann Tudor Allen. The school was originally located at 16th and Meridian streets in Indianapolis. It later moved to a two-building campus at 32nd and Meridian streets where it remained for several decades. In 1960, Tudor Hall moved to the Charles B. Sommers estate on Cold Spring Road, next to Park School. In addition to the day school program, it fostered a significant boarding program. After the 1970 merger with Park School, Tudor Hall was consolidated with Park School into the new College Avenue campus.

Park School began in 1914 as The Brooks School for Boys. In 1920, seven Indianapolis businessmen purchased the school to save it from financial problems and renamed it Boys Preparatory School. The school was originally located at 16th Street and Central Avenue before moving to the former Carl Fisher estate on Cold Spring Road which now serves as a portion of Marian University. The name was changed to Park School in 1929 to reflect the park-like atmosphere of the Cold Spring campus. The school finally moved to the current Park Tudor campus at 7200 North College Avenue.

Both Park School and Tudor Hall were founded to provide the same college preparatory education as was often found in the eastern states of the United States. The schools each earned a respected national reputation, often earning its graduates automatic admission to many of the country's top-tier colleges and universities. Because the two schools were often geographically located near each other, and as families also often sent their children to both schools, Park School and Tudor Hall developed a close association. Dances, dramatic performances, and other activities were often arranged jointly.

During the mid-1960s, Tudor Hall began to eliminate its lower grades while Park School began to admit girls to its Lower School. The two schools then merged in 1970 to form Park-Tudor School at the College Avenue campus. The hyphen was removed from the name by 1981. The property had been donated by Eli Lilly and his brother Josiah K. Lilly Jr. It had previously served as a family retreat and apple orchard known as Lilly Orchard. Apple cider, apples, and other similar products are still sold at the campus each autumn. The campus plan and buildings were largely designed by noted Indianapolis architect H. Roll McLaughlin.

The merged school initially planned to continue Tudor Hall's respected boarding school program. The plan was dropped, citing the diminished enrollment in its program as well as those across the country. The school's official crest borrows a crown, which formed Tudor's crest, and a tree on a shield from Park's final crest. Likewise, the colors for the merged school became red and white. Park's colors had been red and black while Tudor used green and white. The yearbook's name, Chronicle, continued that of Tudor Hall's. The Park School newspaper, The Red and Black, was changed to The Apple Press and later "The Tribune."

Major buildings on the campus include the historic Foster Hall (named after composer Stephen Foster by Foster enthusiast/collector Eli Lilly Jr.), Allen W. Clowes Commons dining hall (1967), Frederic M. Ayres Auditorium (1976,2021), Jane Holton Upper School (1970), Middle School (1988), Lower School (1967), Hilbert Early Education Center (1997), Fine Arts Building (1976), Ruth Lilly Science Center (1989), and the Irsay Family Sports Center for Health and Wellness (2021–22).

Academics
Park Tudor's core curriculum includes studies in English, math, physical education and health, science, social studies, technology, and world languages. Students are also offered studies in Spanish, French, Latin, Classical Greek, and Chinese.

The Upper School curriculum challenges students with an offering of sixteen Advanced Placement courses and the unique Global Scholars program for highly motivated juniors and seniors. The Global Scholars program was developed by teacher Jan Guffin as a progression from the International Baccalaureate (IB) program, with which he previously had been involved at another school. Global Scholars challenges students in grades 11 and 12 with a Philosophies of Knowing course, independent research, self-assessments, 200 hours of community service, and AP exams in five subjects. The culmination of the program is a presentation of a two-year research project with the help of a mentor (often a professional involved with the project topic).

Athletics
Park Tudor is a member of the Pioneer Conference. The school fields teams for the Upper School and Middle School in baseball, basketball, cheerleading, crew, cross country, football, golf, lacrosse, soccer, softball, swimming, tennis, track & field, wrestling, and volleyball.

The 2010-11 varsity boys basketball team won the IHSAA Class 2A State Finals in March 2011. The team followed with another IHSAA Class 2A State Championship in 2012. On March 29, 2014, Park Tudor School's varsity basketball team won the IHSAA Class 2A State Finals again.

The girls' soccer team won the soccer program's first state championship in November 2019.

Other team state championships include girls' tennis (6), boys' tennis (7), ice hockey (7), baseball, girls' lacrosse, and boys' lacrosse. The Park Tudor boys lacrosse team recorded the only undefeated season in state history on its way to the 2001 state title.

Notable alumni
Anne Hendricks Bass, documentary filmmaker and philanthropist
Albert J. Beveridge, American historian and U.S. Senator
Thomas W. Binford, entrepreneur and philanthropist
Janet "Genêt" Flanner, writer and journalist
Ruth Lilly, philanthropist
J. B. Rogers, film director and producer
Bernard Vonnegut, atmospheric scientist
Melanie Wood, mathematician
Neil Funk, former sport commentator
Ed Carpenter, auto racing driver
Micah Johnson, former professional baseball player
Kevin "Yogi" Ferrell, professional basketball player
Trevon Bluiett, professional basketball player
Jaren Jackson Jr., professional basketball player

See also
List of high schools in Indiana
List of schools in Indianapolis

References

External links

Educational institutions established in 1902
Private high schools in Indiana
Schools in Indianapolis
Private middle schools in Indiana
Private elementary schools in Indiana
Preparatory schools in Indiana
1902 establishments in Indiana